Eustathius of Thessalonica (or Eustathios of Thessalonike; ; c. 1115 – 1195/6) was a Byzantine Greek scholar and Archbishop of Thessalonica. He is most noted for his contemporary account of the sack of Thessalonica by the Normans in 1185, for his orations and for his commentaries on Homer, which incorporate many remarks by much earlier researchers.

He was officially canonized on June 10, 1988, and his feast day is on September 20.

Life 
A pupil of Nicholas Kataphloron, Eustathius was appointed to the offices of superintendent of petitions (epi ton deeseon), professor of rhetoric, and was ordained a deacon in Constantinople.

He was ordained bishop of Myra. Around the year 1178, he was appointed to the archbishopric of Thessalonica, where he remained until his death around  1195/1196.

Accounts of his life and work are given in the funeral orations by Euthymius and Michael Choniates (of which manuscripts survive in the Bodleian Library in the University of Oxford). Niketas Choniates (viii.238, x.334) praised him as the most learned man of his age, a judgment which is difficult to dispute. He wrote commentaries on ancient Greek poets, theological treatises, addresses, letters, and an important account of the sack of Thessalonica by William II of Sicily in 1185.

Of his works, his commentaries on Homer are the most widely referred to: they display an extensive knowledge of Greek literature from the earliest to the latest times. Other works exhibit impressive character, and oratorical power, which earned him the esteem of the Komnenoi emperors. Politically, Eustathios was a supporter of emperor Manuel I. An original thinker, Eustathios sometimes praised such secular values as military prowess. He decried slavery, and believed in the concept of historical progress of civilization from a primitive to a more advanced state.

Works
His most important works are the following:

 On the Capture of Thessalonica, an eye-witness account of the siege of 1185 and subsequent sufferings of the people of Thessalonica. In early sections of this memoir Eustathios describes also political events at Constantinople from the death of emperor Manuel I through the short reign of Alexios II to the usurpation of Andronikos I, with sharp comments on the activities of all involved. The Greek text was edited by Kyriakidis, with an Italian translation by V. Rotolo; there is an English translation (with a commentary and associated essays) by J. Melville-Jones (Byzantina Australiensia Volume 8), a French translation by Paolo Odorico, and a German translation by H. Hunger.
 A number of orations, some of which have been edited by P. Wirth (Eustathii Thessalonicensis Opera Minora). In 2013 a translation of six of the earliest of these speeches was published with a commentary by Andrew F. Stone (Byzantina Australiensia Volume 19).
 Commentaries on Homer's Iliad and Odyssey. These address questions of grammar, etymology, mythology, history and geography. They are not so much original commentaries as extracts from earlier commentators - there are many correspondences with Homeric scholia. Drawing on numerous extensive works of Alexandrian grammarians and critics and later commentators, they are a very important contribution to Homeric scholarship, not least because some of the works from which Eustathios made extracts are lost.

Although it is likely that Eustathios quotes some authors second-hand, he seems personally acquainted with the works of the greatest ancient critics - Aristarchos of Samothrace, Zenodotos, Aristophanes of Byzantium, and others. This is a great tribute to the state of the libraries of Constantinople and of classical scholarship there in the 12th century. He was also an avid reader of the Deipnosophistae of Athenaeus. Some of the etymological and grammatical comments by Eustathios's Alexandrian predecessors are full of errors; and Eustathios's own comments are diffuse and frequently interrupted by  digressions.

The first printed edition, by Majoranus, was published in Rome in 1542-1550 (4 vols., fol.), an inaccurate reprint being later published in Basel in 1559-1560. A. Politi's edition (Florence, 1730, 3 vols., folio), contains only the commentary on the first five books of the Iliad with a Latin translation. A tolerably correct reprint of the Roman edition was published at Leipzig, the first part containing the Odyssey commentary (2 vols., 4to.), 1825-1826, and the second, containing the Iliad commentary (3 vols., 4to.), edited by J. G. Stallbaum for the Patrologia Graeca, 1827-1829. These were superseded by the edition of M. van der Valk, 1971 onwards. Extracts from the commentaries are quoted in many editions of the Homeric poems.

 A commentary on Dionysius Periegetes (dedicated to John Doukas, son of Andronikos Kamateros). This is as diffuse as the commentary on Homer, but includes numerous valuable extracts from earlier writers.  (It was first printed in R. Stephens' edition of Dionysius (Paris, 1547, 4to.), and later in that of H. Stephens (Paris, 1577, 4to., and 1697, 8vo.), in Hudson's Geograph. Minor, vol. iv., and lastly, in Bernhardy's edition of Dionysius (Leipzig, 1828, 8vo.).
 A commentary on Pindar. No manuscript of this has come to light; but the introduction survives. (The introduction was first published by Gottlieb Tafel in his Eustathii Thessalonicensis Opuscula (Frankfurt, 1832, 4to.), from which it was reprinted separately by Schneidewin, Eustathii prooemium commentariorum Pindaricorum (Göttingen, 1837, 8vo.).
Other published works. Some were first published by Tafel in the 1832 Opuscula just mentioned, some appeared later, as by P. Wirth for the Corpus Fontium Historiae Byzantinae series.
Unpublished works. These include theological writings and commemorative speeches. Several of the latter are important historical sources.

Citations

References
 
Eustathius.  Eustathii archiepiscopi Thessalonicensis commentarii ad Homeri Iliadem pertinentes, vols. 1-4 (ed. Marchinus van der Valk).  Leyden: Brill, 1:1971; 2:1976; 3:1979; 4:1987.  
 
 
Smith, William (editor); Dictionary of Greek and Roman Biography and Mythology, "Eustathius (7)", Boston, (1867)
Schaff, Philip, Eustathius of Thessalonica, from History of the Christian Church, 1882.
Stone, A.F., "Aurality in the Panegyrics of Eustathios of Thessaloniki in Theatron", Rhetorical Culture in Late Antiquity and the Middle Ages, Walter de Gruyter, Berlin, pp. 417–28.

Sources

Further reading
 Eustathios of Thessaloniki, The Capture of Thessaloniki, tr. J. R. Melville-Jones (Canberra 1988).

External links

Opera Omnia by Migne Patrologia Graeca with analytical indexes

1110s births
1190s deaths
12th-century Byzantine bishops
12th-century Byzantine writers
12th-century Byzantine historians
12th-century Eastern Orthodox bishops
Byzantine bishops of Thessalonica
Byzantine theologians
Byzantine Thessalonian writers
Byzantine grammarians
Eastern Orthodox metropolitans
Saints of medieval Greece
Writers from Constantinople
Saints of medieval Macedonia
12th-century Eastern Orthodox theologians
Homeric scholars